Luka Sučić (born 8 September 2002) is a Croatian professional footballer who plays as a midfielder for Austrian Bundesliga club Red Bull Salzburg and the Croatia national team.

Career

On 15 July 2020, Sučić signed a new contract with Red Bull Salzburg, until the summer of 2024.

He made his Bundesliga debut for Salzburg on 13 September 2020 in a game against Wolfsberg. On 25 November 2020, he made his Champions League debut, replacing Dominik Szoboszlai in 71st minute and providing Rasmus Kristensen with a pre-assist for Mërgim Berisha's goal, as Salzburg lost 3–1 to Bayern Munich. On 10 February 2021, Sučić scored his debut Bundesliga goal in a 3–1 victory over Austria Wien, coming off the bench to replace Berisha.

By the beginning of the 2021–22 season, Sučić already established himself in Salzburg's squad, most notably scoring an impressive goal against Barcelona in a friendly 2–1 victory on 4 August 2021. On 14 September, he scored his first Champions League goal in a 1–1 draw with Sevilla.

International career
Eligible for Austria, Bosnia and Herzegovina and Croatia, Sučić explicitly opted for Croatia, despite interest from the Austrian Football Association. On 9 March 2021, he was named in Igor Bišćan's 23-man squad for the group stage of UEFA Under-21 Euro 2021; however, he was ruled out on 21 March due to an injury and replaced by Matej Vuk. On 17 May, he was named in Bišćan's 23-man squad for the knockout stage of the tournament; however, the same occurred and he was replaced by Neven Đurasek on 25 May. During UEFA Under-21 Euro 2023 qualifiers in September and October 2021, Sučić scored three goals and assisted once in three games, prompting Zlatko Dalić to call him up to the senior team on 9 October, two days ahead of a World Cup qualifier against Slovakia, due to Mateo Kovačić's suspension. He made his senior debut in the said qualifier, which ended as a 2–2 draw.

On 9 November 2022, Sučić was named in Dalić's 26-man squad for the 2022 FIFA World Cup, where he remained an unused substitute as Croatia finished third.

Personal life
Sučić was born in Linz to Bosnian Croat parents Željko and Branislava from Bugojno who fled from the Bosnian War. Despite being born in Linz, Sučić does not hold Austrian citizenship. He declared himself a fan of Hajduk Split and Barcelona; however, he named Luka Modrić, a legend of those clubs' respective rivals Dinamo Zagreb and Real Madrid, as his footballing role model.

Career statistics

Club

Notes

International

Honours
Red Bull Salzburg
 Austrian Bundesliga: 2020–21, 2021–22
 Austrian Cup: 2020–21, 2021–22
Croatia

 FIFA World Cup third place: 2022

References

External links
 

2002 births
Living people
Footballers from Linz
Association football midfielders
Croatian footballers
Croatia youth international footballers
Croatia under-21 international footballers
Croatia international footballers
2022 FIFA World Cup players
FC Red Bull Salzburg players
FC Liefering players
2. Liga (Austria) players
Austrian Football Bundesliga players